Aníbal Diniz (born December 13, 1962) is a Brazilian journalist and politician. He represented Acre in the Federal Senate from 2010 to 2015. He is a member of the Workers' Party.

References

Living people
1962 births
Members of the Federal Senate (Brazil)
Workers' Party (Brazil) politicians